The American West Conference men's basketball tournament was the conference championship tournament in men's basketball for the American West Conference (AWC). The tournament was held annually between 1995 and 1996, after which the conference disbanded.

Tournament champions by year

Finals appearances by school

See also
Big West Conference men's basketball tournament
Big Sky Conference men's basketball tournament

References

Tournament